John Noseworthy may refer to:

Jack Noseworthy, born John Noseworthy, American actor
John Noseworthy, a Canadian politician.
John H. Noseworthy, neurologist and CEO of the Mayo Clinic
John Noseworthy (English politician) (by 1481–1530/1532), English mayor and MP